The North Key Construction Men's Open (also known as the Napanee Cash Spiel) was a bonspiel part of the men's Ontario Curling Tour. The event was held at the Napanee Curling Club in Napanee, Ontario.

Past Champions

External links
2012 event site

Ontario Curling Tour events
Lennox and Addington County